The 2019 Philippine Basketball Association (PBA) Philippine Cup, also known as the 2019 Honda Click–PBA Philippine Cup for sponsorship reasons, was the first conference of the 2019 PBA season of the Philippine Basketball Association (PBA). The 41st PBA Philippine Cup began on January 13 and ended on May 15, 2019. The tournament does not allow teams to hire foreign players or imports.

Format
The following format will be observed for the duration of the conference: 
 Single-round robin eliminations; 11 games per team; Teams are then seeded by basis on win–loss records.
Top eight teams will advance to the quarterfinals. In case of tie, playoff games will be held only for the #8 seed.
Quarterfinals:
QF1: #1 vs #8 (#1 twice-to-beat)
QF2: #2 vs #7 (#2 twice-to-beat)
QF3: #3 vs #6 (best-of-3 series)
QF4: #4 vs #5 (best-of-3 series)
Semifinals (best-of-7 series):
SF1: QF1 Winner vs. QF4 Winner
SF2: QF2 Winner vs. QF3 Winner
Finals (best-of-7 series)
F1: SF1 Winner vs SF2 Winner

Elimination round

Team standings

Schedule

Results

Eighth seed playoff

Bracket

Quarterfinals

(1) Phoenix vs. (8) Alaska 
Phoenix, with the twice-to-beat advantage, only has to win once, while its opponent, Alaska, has to win twice.

(2) Rain or Shine vs. (7) NorthPort 
Rain or Shine, with the twice-to-beat advantage, only has to win once, while its opponent, NorthPort, has to win twice.

(3) Barangay Ginebra vs. (6) Magnolia 
This is a best-of-three playoff.

(4) TNT vs. (5) San Miguel  
This is a best-of-three playoff.

Semifinals

(1) Phoenix vs. (5) San Miguel

(2) Rain or Shine vs. (6) Magnolia

Finals

Awards

Conference
The Best Player and Best Import of the Conference awards were handed out prior to Game 4 of the Finals, at the Smart Araneta Coliseum:
Best Player of the Conference:: June Mar Fajardo 
Finals MVP: June Mar Fajardo

Players of the Week

Rookies of the Month

Statistics

Individual statistical leaders

Individual game highs

Team statistical leaders

References

External links
 Official website

Philippine Cup
PBA Philippine Cup